Erythrolamprus pseudocorallus, the false coral snake, is a species of snake in the family Colubridae. The species is found in Venezuela and Colombia.

References

Erythrolamprus
Reptiles of Venezuela
Reptiles of Colombia
Reptiles described in 1959
Taxa named by Janis Roze